The 1996 United States presidential election in New Jersey took place on November 5, 1996, and was part of the 1996 United States presidential election. Voters chose 15 representatives, or electors to the Electoral College, who voted for president and vice president. The major contenders were incumbent Democratic President Bill Clinton and Republican Senator from Kansas Bob Dole, with Reform Party candidate Ross Perot – listed as an "Independent" in New Jersey – running a distant third.

New Jersey voted decisively to re-elect Democrat Bill Clinton, giving him 53.72% of the vote over Republican Bob Dole's 35.86%, a margin of 17.86%.

This double-digit win indicated a major shift in New Jersey politics toward the Democratic Party. As recently as the 1980s, Republican presidential candidates had easily carried the state by double-digit margins. In 1992, Bill Clinton had won the state with a narrow 43-41 plurality over George H.W. Bush, however, the state was still 3% more Republican than the nation at large. However, in 1996, New Jersey voted 9.33% more Democratic than the rest of the nation, which represented the first time the state voted more Democratic than the nation since 1964 and only the third time since 1904. This marked the first time since 1964 that the state voted Democratic in consecutive elections. As in neighboring New York and many other states, Clinton in 1996 drastically improved his electoral performance among suburban voters, a key voting bloc in New Jersey. 

Following this election, New Jersey has become a reliable blue state in presidential elections, not being seriously contested by Republicans since. Despite this, Dole is currently the only Republican to fail to garner 40 percent of the New Jersey ballot since Barry Goldwater in 1964. Clinton also became the first Democrat since 1964 to win Cape May, Ocean, Monmouth, Bergen and Passaic Counties – the last pair having never voted for a Republican since. It is also the last time that Cape May and Ocean Counties voted Democratic in a presidential election, and the last time that Cape May County voted Democratic in a statewide election.

Results

Results by county

Counties that flipped from Republican to Democratic
Bergen (largest municipality: Hackensack)
Cape May (largest municipality: Lower Township)
Monmouth (largest municipality: Middletown Township)
Ocean (largest municipality: Lakewood Township)
Passaic (largest municipality: Paterson)
Salem (largest municipality: Pennsville Township)

See also
 United States presidential elections in New Jersey
 Presidency of Bill Clinton

References

New Jersey
1996
1996 New Jersey elections